Giovanni Antonio Sanna (Sassari, 29 August  1819 – Rome, 9 February 1875) was an Italian entrepreneur  and  politician.

Biography

Giovanni Antonio Sanna was son of Giuseppe Sanna, a lawyer, and Maria Ignazia Sanna. He migrated in Marseille, France, where he became a merchant. He married Maria Llambi y Casas, a Catalonia-born Spanish woman, with whom he had four daughters.
In 1860 he became the owner of the Turinese newspaper "Il Diritto". He founded the "Banca Agricola Sarda" (Sardinian Agricultural Bank) in 1871.
He was elected deputy of parliament of the Italian Kingdom for three legislatures, from 1857 to 1865.

He became the owner of the Montevecchio Mine,  localised in the South West of Sardinia, the main mining site in Italy.  He started modern industrial mining activity in the area

Honors and awards
Knight of the Order of Saints Maurice and Lazarus - 1866

See also
Montevecchio

References

Bibliography
P. Fadda, L´Uomo di Montevecchio, Carlo Delfino Editore, Sassari, 2010;
R. Ciasca, Bibliografia sarda, Roma, 1931–34, vol. IV, pp. 36–37, nn. 15865-15870;
F. Spanu Satta, Memorie sarde in Roma, Sassari, 1962, pp. 172–173, 185;
I. Sanna, Giovanni Antonio Sanna nella vita pubblica e privata, Roma, 1914, p. 416

People from Sassari
1819 births
1875 deaths